The Saskatchewan Amateur Women's Golf Championship is the annual women's provincial golf championship, sanctioned by Golf Saskatchewan.

The championship has been held since 1914. The top three competitors from Saskatchewan earn the opportunity to represent the province at the Canadian Women's Amateur Championship.

Winners

Most victories

Source:

References

Golf tournaments in Saskatchewan
Amateur golf tournaments in Canada